The Gjaerumiaceae are a family of smut fungi in the Basidiomycota, class Exobasidiomycetes. The family is monotypic, and contains the single genus Gjaerumia. Species in the family are distributed in northern Europe, where they grow biotrophically in leaves of the bog asphodel.

References 

Ustilaginomycotina
Fungal plant pathogens and diseases
Basidiomycota families
Monogeneric fungus families
Taxa named by Franz Oberwinkler